El Pato Air Base is a Peruvian Air Force base located near the city of Talara in the Piura Region of Peru,  northwest of FAP Captain Víctor Montes Arias International Airport.

See also
Transport in Peru
List of airports in Peru

References

External links
OpenStreetMap - El Pato
OurAirports - El Pato

Peruvian Air Force